Research in Organizational Behavior is a peer-reviewed scientific journal which publishes research in the field of organizational behavior. It was established in 1979 and is published by Elsevier. The editors-in-chief are Arthur Brief (University of Utah) and Barry Shaw (University of California at Berkeley). According to the Journal Citation Reports, the journal has a 2016 impact factor of 2.550.

References

External links

Elsevier academic journals
Publications established in 1979
English-language journals
Organizational psychology journals